Jan Eduard de Quay (26 August 1901 – 4 July 1985) was a Dutch politician of the defunct Catholic People's Party (KVP) now the Christian Democratic Appeal (CDA) party and psychologist who served as Prime Minister of the Netherlands from 19 May 1959 until 24 July 1963.

De Quay studied Applied psychology and Literature at the Utrecht University obtaining Master of Psychology and Letters degree's followed by a postgraduate education in Clinical Psychology at the Stanford University obtaining a Master of Social Science degree and worked as a researcher and associate professor of Applied psychology at the University of Tilburg from September 1927 until August 1939 before finishing his thesis at his alma and graduated as a Doctor of Psychology in Applied psychology and worked as a professor of Applied psychology, business administration and business theory at the University of Tilburg from March 1933 until August 1939. De Quay also served as Rector Magnificus of the University from January 1938 until January 1939. During World War II De Quay was co-founder of the controversial Dutch Union in July 1940 but the organisation was disbanded by the German occupation authority in December 1941. Shortly before the end of the War De Quay was appointed as Minister of War in the Cabinet Gerbrandy III, the last government-in-exile taking office on 4 April 1945. After a cabinet formation De Quay wasn't included in the new cabinet. De Quay continued to be active in politics and in September 1946 was nominated as the next Queen's Commissioner of North Brabant taking office on 1 November 1946. After the election of 1959 De Quay was persuaded to lead a new cabinet. Following a successful cabinet formation De Quay formed the Cabinet De Quay and became Prime Minister of the Netherlands taking office on 19 May 1959.

Before the election of 1963 De Quay indicated that he wouldn't serve another term as Prime Minister or not stand for the election. De Quay left office following the installation of the Cabinet Marijnen on 24 July 1963. De Quay was elected as a Member of the Senate after the Senate election of 1963 taking office on 25 June 1963 serving as a frontbencher and spokesperson for Foreign Affairs. After a political crisis De Quay was appointed as Deputy Prime Minister and Minister of Transport and Water Management in the caretaker Cabinet Zijlstra taking office on 22 November 1966. Shortly thereafter De Quay announced that he would decline to serve in new cabinet and returned to the Senate serving from 13 June 1967 until 16 September 1969.

De Quay retired from active politics at 68 and became active in the private and public sectors as a corporate and non-profit director and served on several state commissions and councils on behalf of the government. De Quay was known for his abilities as an effective team leader and consensus builder. During his premiership, his cabinet was responsible for major reforms to the education system, the public sector, social security and dealing with several major crises such as the West New Guinea dispute. De Quay withdrew from public life and lived in retirement until his death in July 1985 at the age of 83. He holds the distinction as the leading the first cabinet to have completed a full term after World War II and his premiership is consistently regarded both by scholars and the public to have been average.

Biography

Early life
Jan Eduard de Quay was born in 's-Hertogenbosch on 26 August 1901. After attending a Jesuit school in Katwijk, he graduated in psychology from the University of Utrecht in 1926. The following year he was awarded a doctorate for his thesis on the contribution of sensory and motor factors to the learning and labour process.

In 1928 he was appointed lecturer in psychotechnology at the Catholic college of higher education in Tilburg (now the University of Tilburg) and in 1933 professor of business economics and psychotechnology at the same institution. During the pre-war mobilisation of the Netherlands (1939-1940) De Quay became a lieutenant in the reserve. In July 1940 he formed the Triumvirate of the controversial nationalist Dutch Union with Louis Einthoven and Hans Linthorst Homan. This Union was controversial because its leaders suggested partial collaboration with the German occupiers. In August 1940 De Quay started secret meetings with the fascistic Nationaal Front in oder to fuse the two organisations. During these talks De Quay called himself a fascist, the Union a fascistic organisation and said that he rejected democracy. In May and June of the same year he was government commissioner for labour at the Ministry of Social Affairs. In this position he encouraged the Dutch population to seek employment in Germany. From July 1942 to June 1943 he was interned in Haaren, after which he went into hiding from the occupation authorities. This lasted until June 1943, when he went into hiding. Following the liberation of the area south of the rivers in late 1944, he became chairman of the Board of Commissioners for Agriculture, Industry, Trade and Commerce set up to restore the national economy.

Politics
From 5 April until 23 June 1945, De Quay was Minister of War in the second Gerbrandy cabinet. On 1 November 1946 he became Queen's Commissioner of North Brabant until 19 May 1959.

He served as Prime Minister of the Netherlands from 19 May 1959 until 24 July 1963. The free Saturday was introduced (for civil servants, in 1961), as well as laws for education (mammoetwet), unemployment benefit (bijstandwet) and child benefit (kinderbijslagwet).  Natural gas was discovered in Slochteren, which would later turn out to be one of the biggest gas reserves in the world and a major source of income for the Netherlands in the decades to come. On 23 December 1960 the cabinet fell over extra public housing (woningwetwoningen), but Gaius de Gaay Fortman reconciled matters and the cabinet resumed on 2 January 1961. In August/September 1962, New Guinea was handed over to Indonesia, under supervision of the UN.

Shortly after the installation of the new government, minister of defence Ven den Bergh resigned for personal reasons (family affairs with his United States wife and children). In 1962, the new minister of defence Visser also had to resign after protests against his dismissal of a critical civil servant. In 1961 minister Van Rooy of social affairs resigned after criticism of how he dealt with the new child benefit law. His post was taken over by former state secretary Veldkamp, whose now vacant former position in turn was taken over by Gijzels. In 1963, a proposal to install commercial television was not accepted.

He served as a Member of the Senate from 25 June 1963 until 22 November 1966. During the Cabinet Zijlstra he served as Minister of Transport, Public Works and Water Management and Deputy Prime Minister from 22 November 1966 until 5 April 1967. On 13 June 1967 he again was a Member of the Senate until 16 September 1969.

Personal life
On 8 August 1927, De Quay married Maria van der Lande (29 August 1901 – 6 November 1988). De Quay died on 4 July 1985 in Beers, he was 83.

Decorations

References

External links

Official
  Dr. J.E. (Jan) de Quay Parlement & Politiek
  Dr. J.E. de Quay (KVP) Eerste Kamer der Staten-Generaal
  Kabinet-De Quay Rijksoverheid

1901 births
1985 deaths
Catholic People's Party politicians
Commanders of the Order of the Netherlands Lion
Deputy Prime Ministers of the Netherlands
Dutch academic administrators
Dutch business theorists
Dutch business writers
Dutch education writers
Dutch expatriates in the United States
Dutch management consultants
Dutch people of World War II
Dutch political party founders
Dutch prisoners of war in World War II
Dutch psychologists
Dutch Roman Catholics
Dutch science writers
Dutch sociologists
Grand Officers of the Order of Orange-Nassau
King's and Queen's Commissioners of North Brabant
Knights of the Holy Sepulchre
Members of the Senate (Netherlands)
Ministers of Defence of the Netherlands
Ministers of General Affairs of the Netherlands
Ministers of Transport and Water Management of the Netherlands
Ministers of War of the Netherlands
People from Cuijk
People from 's-Hertogenbosch
Prime Ministers of the Netherlands
Psychology writers
Rectors of universities in the Netherlands
Roman Catholic State Party politicians
Royal Netherlands Army officers
Royal Netherlands Army personnel of World War II
Stanford University alumni
Academic staff of Tilburg University
Utrecht University alumni
Academic staff of Utrecht University
World War II civilian prisoners
World War II prisoners of war held by Germany
20th-century Dutch educators
20th-century Dutch male writers
20th-century Dutch politicians
20th-century Dutch scientists
20th-century psychologists